Llano Abajo is a corregimiento in Guararé District, Los Santos Province, Panama with a population of 550 as of 2010. Its population as of 1990 was 898; its population as of 2000 was 511.

References

Corregimientos of Los Santos Province